Dusky Ledge is an area of relatively level exposed rock at about  that forms the northern part of Dusky Ridge in the Britannia Range, Antarctica. It was named by the Advisory Committee on Antarctic Names in association with Dusky Ridge.

References 

Ridges of Oates Land